Pavel Vladimirovich Andreev (born November 24, 1978 in Tashkent) is an Uzbekistani decathlete. He is a two-time Olympian and a three-time medalist for the decathlon at the Asian Athletics Championships.

Andreev made his official debut for the 2004 Summer Olympics in Athens, where he did not finish the men's decathlon event for failing to attain a mark in the long jump.

At the 2008 Summer Olympics in Beijing, Andreev competed for the second time in the men's decathlon, along with his compatriot Vitaliy Smirnov. He suffered another setback again for this event, as he pulled himself up in the second heat of the 400 metres, and ultimately, did not finish the race.

References

External links

NBC 2008 Olympics profile

1978 births
Living people
Sportspeople from Tashkent
Uzbekistani decathletes
Uzbekistani male athletes
Olympic athletes of Uzbekistan
Athletes (track and field) at the 2004 Summer Olympics
Athletes (track and field) at the 2008 Summer Olympics
Asian Games competitors for Uzbekistan
Athletes (track and field) at the 2002 Asian Games
Athletes (track and field) at the 2006 Asian Games
21st-century Uzbekistani people